Penicillium meloforme is an anamorph species of the genus Penicillium.

References

Further reading 
 

meloforme
Fungi described in 1973